Dissident republicans, renegade republicans, anti-Agreement republicans, or anti-ceasefire republicans are Irish republicans who do not support the current peace agreements in Northern Ireland. The agreements followed a 30-year conflict known as the Troubles, which killed over 3,500 people. During the conflict, republican paramilitary groups such as the Provisional Irish Republican Army waged a campaign to bring about a united Irish republic. Peace negotiations in the 1990s led to an IRA ceasefire in 1994 and to the Good Friday Agreement of 1998. Mainstream republicans, represented by Sinn Féin, supported the Agreement as a means of achieving Irish unity peacefully. Dissidents saw this as an abandonment of the goal of an Irish socialist republic and acceptance of partition. They hold that the Northern Ireland Assembly and Police Service of Northern Ireland (PSNI) are illegitimate and see the PSNI as a "British paramilitary police force".

Some dissident republican political groups, such as Republican Sinn Féin (which was established by a split from Sinn Féin, and no longer has a connection to the party) and the 32 County Sovereignty Movement, support political violence against the British security forces. Thus, they oppose the Provisional IRA's 1994 ceasefire. However, other groups, such as the Republican Network for Unity, wish to achieve their goals only through peaceful means.

Since the IRA called a ceasefire, splinter groups have continued an armed campaign against the British security forces in Northern Ireland. Like the Provisional IRA, each of these groups sees itself as the only rightful successor of the original IRA and each calls itself simply "the IRA", or Óglaigh na hÉireann in Irish (see also Irish republican legitimism).

Groups described as dissident republican

Paramilitary
Continuity Irish Republican Army (Continuity IRA)
Cumann na mBan
Fianna Éireann
Irish Republican Liberation Army (IRLA)
Irish Republican Movement (IRM)
New Irish Republican Army (New IRA)
Óglaigh na hÉireann (Real IRA splinter group) (2009-2018)
Real Irish Republican Army (Real IRA)

Political
32 County Sovereignty Movement (32CSM)
Irish Republican Voice (IRV) (disbanded 2014)
Republican Network for Unity (RNU)
Republican Sinn Féin (RSF)
Saoradh

References

Dissent
Dissident Irish republican campaign
Irish republicanism
Northern Ireland peace process
Politics of Northern Ireland